Arturo Igoroin Sanjurjo (born 14 September 1976) is a Spanish retired professional footballer who played as a forward, and is a current board member of FC Cartagena.

Playing career
Born in Vitoria-Gasteiz, Álava, Basque Country, Sívori joined Deportivo Alavés' youth setup at the age of 14. After making his senior debut with the reserves in Tercera División, he first appeared with the main squad on 4 September 1996, coming on as a half-time substitute in a 1–0 away win against Cultural y Deportiva Leonesa, for the season's Copa del Rey.

Sívori became a regular starter for Alavés in the 1997–98 campaign, as his side achieved promotion to La Liga. On 1 July 1998, he agreed to a move to Athletic Bilbao for a fee of 348 million pesetas, effective as of July 1999; he remained with the Babazorros for a further year, making his debut in the main category on 29 August 1998 by starting in a 0–0 home draw against Real Betis.

In 2000, after featuring sparingly for Athletic, Sívori was loaned to Córdoba CF in the second division, for one year. He was released by the Lions in July 2001, and subsequently signed for CD Leganés also in division two.

In 2003, Sívori agreed to a contract with FC Cartagena in Segunda División B, where he acted as team captain during his five-year spell. On 11 July 2008, he moved to fellow league team Águilas CF.

Sívori subsequently represented lower league sides Caravaca CF, Mar Menor CF and La Unión CF, helping the latter to achieve promotion to the fourth division in 2013 by scoring a career-best 12 goals. He retired in 2014, aged 38.

Managerial career
Immediately after retiring Sívori became a coach, being a manager of his last club La Unión CF's youth setup. In 2015, he became an assistant manager of the main squad, before being appointed manager in July 2017.

In July 2018, Sívori became the manager of FC La Unión Atlético also in the fourth division, after the board acquired the place of FC Pinatar Arena. He was sacked the following March, and subsequently became a sporting director.

In August 2019, Sívori returned to his former side Cartagena, to work in the club's board. In March 2020, he became Borja Jiménez's assistant in the main squad.

References

External links

1976 births
Living people
People from Vitoria-Gasteiz
Spanish footballers
Footballers from the Basque Country (autonomous community)
Association football forwards
La Liga players
Segunda División players
Segunda División B players
Tercera División players
Divisiones Regionales de Fútbol players
Deportivo Alavés B players
Deportivo Alavés players
Athletic Bilbao footballers
Córdoba CF players
CD Leganés players
FC Cartagena footballers
Águilas CF players
Caravaca CF players
Mar Menor FC players
Spanish football managers
Tercera División managers